Larry L. Noble was an Iowa State Senator from the 35th District. He served in the Iowa Senate from 2007 until his resignation on December 17, 2010, to become Commissioner of the Iowa Department of Public Safety. He earned his BA in Criminal Justice Administration from Central Missouri State University (now the University of Central Missouri) in 1973.

Noble was elected in 2006 with 16,694 votes (52%), defeating Democratic opponent Merle O. Johnson. He was re-elected in 2010 with 27,563 votes, running unopposed.

References

External links

Senator Larry Noble official Iowa General Assembly site
Senator Larry Noble at Iowa Senate Republican Caucus
 

Republican Party Iowa state senators
Living people
University of Central Missouri alumni
People from Grandview, Missouri
People from Ankeny, Iowa
Year of birth missing (living people)